California Fish Grill is a chain of restaurants located in the Greater Los Angeles, San Francisco Bay Area, Sacramento metropolitan areas and Las Vegas which specialize in seafood. Their slogan is "Liberating the Love of Seafood". The chain was founded in 1998 in Gardena, California.

Locations
As of February 2021, California Fish Grill has thirty-eight locations in California. It also has a location in Phoenix, Arizona and a location in Nevada.

Menu 
The chain claims to use sustainably sourced seafood. The seafood is wild-caught or farmed following the Seafood Watch advisory list by the Monterey Bay Aquarium.

The menu focuses on flame-grilled seafood. The chain also offers bowls, tacos, and fried seafood.

See also
 List of seafood restaurants

References

External links
Official website

1998 establishments in California
Companies based in Irvine, California
Cuisine of the Western United States
Economy of the Southwestern United States
Restaurants established in 1998
Restaurants in California
Restaurant chains in the United States
Fast casual restaurants
Seafood restaurants in the United States